Michael Schwartz (born September 25, 1976) is an American basketball coach and head coach of the East Carolina Pirates men's basketball team.

Playing career
Schwartz played high school basketball at Beverly Hills High School, and his first two seasons of college basketball at Division II Sonoma State. He would then transfer to Texas to play for Rick Barnes during the 1998–99 season, appearing in one game of the Longhorns' Big 12 regular-season title winning team.

Coaching career
After graduation, Schwartz remained with the Longhorns as a graduate assistant, before making a one-year stop at Long Beach State as a video coach. He'd return to Texas in the same capacity before landing his first full-time assistant coaching position at UTSA. Schwartz would then move on to Miami in an administrative role under Frank Haith before being elevated to assistant coach. In 2011, he'd accept an assistant coaching position at Fresno State from 2011 to 2015. Schwartz would reunite with Haith at Tulsa for one season in 2015 before joining Barnes at Tennessee where he was on staff for the Volunteers' 2017–18 SEC regular season title, four NCAA tournament appearances, and a 2022 SEC tournament title.

On March 16, 2022, Schwartz was named head coach at East Carolina, replacing Joe Dooley.

Head coaching record

References

Living people
1976 births
American men's basketball coaches
East Carolina Pirates men's basketball coaches
Tennessee Volunteers basketball coaches
Tulsa Golden Hurricane men's basketball coaches
Fresno State Bulldogs men's basketball coaches
Miami Hurricanes men's basketball coaches
UTSA Roadrunners men's basketball coaches
Texas Longhorns men's basketball coaches
Long Beach State Beach men's basketball coaches
Texas Longhorns men's basketball players
Sonoma State Seawolves men's basketball players
People from Beverly Hills, California
Basketball coaches from California
Basketball players from California